Gabriele De Nuzzo (born 12 September 1999) is an Italian footballer who plays as a midfielder for  club Fermana.

Club career

Como
In July 2019, De Nuzzo signed a two-year contract extension with the club.

Vis Pesaro
On 11 July 2021, he signed a two-year contract with Vis Pesaro.

Fermana
On 19 August 2022, De Nuzzo joined Fermana on a one-year contract.

International career
De Nuzzo was a young international for Italy.

References

External links

1999 births
Living people
Footballers from Trieste
Italian footballers
Italy youth international footballers
Association football midfielders
Serie C players
Serie D players
Udinese Calcio players
Como 1907 players
Vis Pesaro dal 1898 players
Fermana F.C. players